Bierzów  (German Bierzdorf) is a village in the administrative district of Gmina Skarbimierz, within Brzeg County, Opole Voivodeship, in south-western Poland.

The village has a population of 195.

References

Villages in Brzeg County